Kostas Ezomo (Greek: Κώστας Εζόμο; born September 12, 1989 in Schimatari, Greece) is a Greek basketball player for Neaniki Estia Megaridas B.C. of the Greek B Basket League. He is 6'7' (2.01) tall power forward.

College career
Ezomo played college basketball for Coastal Georgia.

Professional career
Of Nigerian descent, Ezomo start his professional career with Arkadikos in 2014. He stayed with Arkadikos for two seasons and on 2016, he joined Pagrati of the Greek A2 League.

On August 25, 2017, Ezomo joined Kymis of the Greek Basket League.

On September 25, 2021, Ezomo signed with Neaniki Estia Megaridas B.C. of the Greek B Basket League.

References

External links
Eurobasket.com Profile
Arkadikos.gr Profile
RealGM.com Profile
CostalGeorgia.com Profile

1989 births
Living people
Apollon Patras B.C. players
Arkadikos B.C. players
College men's basketball players in the United States
Greek Basket League players
Greek expatriate basketball people in the United States
Greek men's basketball players
Greek people of Nigerian descent
Kymis B.C. players
Pagrati B.C. players
Power forwards (basketball)
People from Boeotia
Sportspeople from Central Greece